Gobind Singh Longowal was elected as President of SGPC on November 29. Gobind Singh Longowal was born in year 1959 in Longowal District Sangrur. He worked as assistant with Harchand Singh Longowal from the age of seven years. In the year 1985 he was elected as MLA from halka Dhanaula. In 1986 he became Chairman of Markfed. In the year 1997 he was again elected as MLA from halka Dhanaula and became minister in the Punjab government. He was again elected as MLA from Dhanaula in the year 2002. He was also appointed Chairman District Planning Board, Sangrur and now serving the people of Dhuri halka.

References

External links
of Education SGPC 
Shiromani Gurdwara Prabhandak Committee
Interview with Gobind Singh Longowal
Gobind Singh longowal take oath 
SGPC OFFERS HOSPITAL by Gobind Singh 
Punjab Punjab Legislative Assembly

1959 births
Living people
Shiromani Akali Dal politicians
Punjab, India MLAs 1985–1990
Punjab, India MLAs 1997–2002
Punjab, India MLAs 2002–2007